Hunter Township is one of fifteen townships in Edgar County, Illinois, USA.  As of the 2010 census, its population was 250 and it contained 111 housing units.   Hunter Township was formed from portions of Stratton Township and Brouilletts Creek Township on an unknown date.

Geography

Extinct towns
 Clays Prairie
 Huffmanville

Cemeteries
The township contains these seven cemeteries: Blackman, Bright, Bruce, Cook, Saint Aloysius, Sixteen and Stafford-Crimmons.

Demographics

School districts
 Edgar County Community Unit District 6
 Paris Community Unit School District 4

Political districts
 Illinois' 15th congressional district
 State House District 109
 State Senate District 55

References
 
 United States Census Bureau 2007 TIGER/Line Shapefiles
 United States National Atlas

External links
 City-Data.com
 Illinois State Archives
 Edgar County Official Site

Townships in Edgar County, Illinois
Townships in Illinois